On 23 January 2022, a nightclub fire in Yaoundé, Cameroon, killed at least 16 people.

Shortly after 2:00 a.m., fireworks were used inside the main room of Liv's Night Club in Bastos, an upmarket area of Cameroon's capital city, Yaoundé, setting fire to the ceiling. The fire spread to a place where cooking gas was stored in bottles, causing two explosions. At least 16 people were killed and another eight injured.

See also 
 Yaoundé stadium disaster, which happened the next day

References

2022 disasters in Cameroon
2022 fires in Africa
2022 in Cameroon
Nightclub fire
Nightclub fire
Explosions in 2022
Explosions in Cameroon
Fires in Cameroon
January 2022 events in Africa
Nightclub fires started by pyrotechnics